Marylyn D. Ritchie is a Professor of Genetics, the Director of the Center for Translational Bioinformatics, the Associate Director for Bioinformatics in the Institute for Biomedical Informatics, and the Associate Director of the Center for Precision Medicine, at the University of Pennsylvania's Perelman School of Medicine.

Career
Marylyn D. Ritchie has published many papers in peer-reviewed journals such as the American Journal of Human Genetics, the Journal of Biological Chemistry, Human Molecular Genetics, Bioinformatics, and PLOS Genetics. Previously, she was an associate professor at Vanderbilt University in the Department of Molecular Physiology and Biophysics and the Department of Biomedical Informatics. She has also served as a consultant for Boehringer-Ingelheim, one of the world's leading pharmaceutical companies.

In 2018 she was appointed to the Center for Translational Genomics and the Institute for Biomedical Informatics at the University of Pennsylvania.

She is the editor-in-chief of the BioData Mining journal since 2016.

Research interests
Her main research interests are Bioinformatics, Computational Genomics, Pharmacogenomics and Genetic Architecture of Complex Human Traits.

Awards and honors
2004 - Best Paper Award at the Genetic and Evolutionary Computation Conference
2006 - Rising Young Investigator Award from the journal Genome Technology
2010 - Alfred P. Sloan Foundation fellowship
2011, 2012 & 2013 - Selected as a fellow of The Kavli Foundation.

References

External links

Year of birth missing (living people)
Living people
American women biochemists
Pennsylvania State University faculty
Vanderbilt University faculty
American women academics
Members of the National Academy of Medicine